Cornish is an incorporated town in eastern Jefferson County, Oklahoma, United States. The population was 163 at the 2010 census, a decline of 5.2 percent from the figure of 172 in 2000.

History
Prior to statehood, Cornish was a community in Pickens County of the Chickasaw Nation. It was named for John E. Cornish, a local resident and cattle rancher. A post office opened in Cornish in 1901. M. E. "Mose" Harris founded the Cornish Orphans Home and began construction in 1907. The home would continue this work for the next forty years.

The town of Ringling was founded in June 1914, near the discovery and on the Oklahoma, New Mexico and Pacific Railway. Many Cornish businessmen and other residents moved to Ringling, and Cornish dwindled away.

Geography

Demographics

As of the census of 2000, there were 172 people, 66 households, and 48 families residing in the town. There were 75 housing units at an average density of 127.3 per square mile (49.1/km2). The racial makeup of the town was 69.77% White, 6.40% Native American, 0.58% Asian, 10.47% from other races, and 12.79% from two or more races. Hispanic or Latino of any race were 13.95% of the population.

There were 66 households, out of which 36.4% had children under the age of 18 living with them, 57.6% were married couples living together, 13.6% had a female householder with no husband present, and 25.8% were non-families. 25.8% of all households were made up of individuals, and 12.1% had someone living alone who was 65 years of age or older. The average household size was 2.61 and the average family size was 3.10.

In the town, the population was spread out, with 30.2% under the age of 18, 5.2% from 18 to 24, 31.4% from 25 to 44, 19.8% from 45 to 64, and 13.4% who were 65 years of age or older. The median age was 36 years. For every 100 females, there were 95.5 males. For every 100 females age 18 and over, there were 100.0 males.

The median income for a household in the town was $16,000, and the median income for a family was $18,750. Males had a median income of $16,750 versus $18,500 for females. The per capita income for the town was $8,981. About 26.9% of families and 27.9% of the population were below the poverty line, including 16.7% of those under the age of eighteen and 56.0% of those 65 or over.

Notes

References

External links
 Encyclopedia of Oklahoma History and Culture - Cornish

Towns in Jefferson County, Oklahoma
Towns in Oklahoma
Populated places established in 1901